Ginifer railway station is located on the Sunbury line in Victoria, Australia. It serves the western Melbourne suburb of St Albans, and opened on 31 October 1982.

History
Ginifer station opened on 31 October 1982. It was first announced in June 1977, by the then Transport Minister Joe Rafferty, and was scheduled for completion by late 1978. Originally to be named Furlong, after the nearby arterial road, when opened it was named Ginifer, in honour of Jack Ginifer, a former local member of State Parliament.

In 1984, boom barriers were provided at the former Furlong Road level crossing, which was located nearby in the Down direction of the station. In 1994, the station was provided with CCTV.

On 4 May 2010, as part of the 2010/2011 State Budget, $83.7 million was allocated to upgrade Ginifer to a Premium Station, along with nineteen others. However, in March 2011, this was scrapped by the Baillieu Government.

In June 2015, the Level Crossing Removal Authority announced that the Furlong Road level crossing would be removed by grade separation, with Ginifer to be rebuilt below ground. During October-November 2016, the level crossing was removed and, on 1 November of that year, the rebuilt station opened.

Platforms and services
Ginifer has two side platforms. It is served by Sunbury line trains.

Platform 1:
  all stations and limited express services to Flinders Street

Platform 2:
  all stations services to Watergardens and Sunbury

Prior to electrification of the line to Sydenham in 2002, selected V/Line services stopped at Ginifer, to pick up/drop off students from the Sydenham Catholic Regional College.

By late 2025, it is planned that trains on the Sunbury line will be through-routed with those on the Pakenham and Cranbourne lines, via the new Metro Tunnel.

Transport links
CDC Melbourne operates two routes via Ginifer station, under contract to Public Transport Victoria:
 : St Albans station – Highpoint Shopping Centre
 : St Albans station – Brimbank Central Shopping Centre

Gallery

References

External links
 
 Melway map at street-directory.com.au

Railway stations in Melbourne
Railway stations in Australia opened in 1982
Railway stations in the City of Brimbank